Don't Take It Personal is a studio album by the American singer Jermaine Jackson, released in 1989. The title track became his second and final US R&B #1 single, and was followed by two more top 30 US R&B hits, "I'd Like to Get to Know You" and "Two Ships".

In 2012, the album was reissued by Funky Town Grooves with an extended track listing.

Critical reception

Robert Christgau wrote: "A mild-voiced journeyman whose heyday is 10 if not 20 years behind him, [Jackson]'s equally bland as love man (title hit promises they can still be friends) and stud (though he does thank six foals on the back cover)." The Calgary Herald called the album "a bunch of sappy love songs that aren't particularly good."

Track listing
"Climb Out" (Danny Sembello, Marti Sharron)
"Don't Take It Personal" (David Conley, David Townsend, Derrick Culler)
"Make It Easy on Love" (duet with Miki Howard) (Clif Magness, Peter Beckett, Steve Kipner) 
"So Right" (Ernie McCane, Ian Prince)
"I'd Like to Get to Know You" (Bernard Jackson)
"Two Ships (In the Night)" (Jermaine Jackson, Conley, Everett Collins)
"Rise to the Occasion" (duet with La La) (Dennis Morgan, Rob Fisher, Simon Climie)
"(C'mon) Feel the Need" (Lewis A. Martinee)
"Next to You" (Clyde Lieberman, Jeff Pescetto)
"Don't Make Me Wait" (Otis Stokes)

Bonus tracks (2012  reissue)
"Don't Take It Personal" (Extended version)
"Don't Take It Personal" (Jazzy Instrumental)
"I'd Like to Get to Know You" (7" Version)
"Two Ships(In the Night)" (Instrumental Remix Version)
"Two Ships (In the Night)" (Lat Night Turbulence Mix)
"Two Ships (In the Night)" (Extended Version)
B-side
 ''Spare the Rod, Love the Child'' (single "I'd Like to Get to Know You")

Personnel
Adapted from AllMusic.

"Bassy" Bob Brockmann – mixing
Tony Calvert – reissue producer
David Conley – mixing, producer
Eileen Connolley – art direction
Derrick Culler – associate producer
David Z – producer
Clive Davis – executive producer
Maureen Droney	– mixing
Preston Glass – producer
Mick Guzauski – mixing
Calvin Harris – mixing
Miki Howard – guest artist
Jermaine Jackson – primary artist
Kashif – producer
Ron "Have Mercy" Kersey – additional production
La La – guest artist
Dennis Lambert – producer
Steve Lindsey – associate producer
Willie Maldonado – photography
Lewis A. Martinee – mixing, producer
Matt Murphy – production manager
Rick Nowels – additional production
Ricky P. – producer
Danny Sembello – mixing, producer
Marti Sharron – mixing, producer
Hill Swimmer – mixing
David Townsend – mixing, producer
Kerk Upper – mixing
Mark Wilder – remastering
Roger Williams – package design

Charts

Weekly charts

Year-end charts

References

1989 albums
Jermaine Jackson albums
Albums produced by Rick Nowels
Arista Records albums